Akkerman or Akkermans is a Dutch surname meaning "man from/working on the field", "farmer". Notable people with the surname include:

 Jan Akkerman (born 1946), Dutch musician and composer
 Peter Akkermans (born 1957), Dutch archaeologist and professor
 Piet Akkermans (1942–2002), former rector of the College of Europe
 Doreen Akkerman (born 1940), prominent member of cancer research. set up cancer information services in Australia, Canada and Singapore. Was honored with an Order of Australia. Inaugural president of the International Cancer Information and Support Service

See also 
 Akkerman (disambiguation)
 Ackerman (surname)
 Ackermann (surname)
 Akerman
 Åkerman
 Ackermans (disambiguation)

References 

Dutch-language surnames
Occupational surnames